Boyan Slat (born 27 July 1994) is a Dutch inventor and entrepreneur. A former aerospace engineering student, he is the CEO of The Ocean Cleanup.

Initial interest in plastic pollution
In 2011, aged 16, Slat found more plastic than fish while diving. He made  ocean plastic pollution the subject of a high school project examining why it was considered impossible to clean up. He later came up with the idea of building a passive plastic catchment system, using circulating ocean currents to net plastic waste, which he presented at a TEDx talk in Delft in 2012.

Slat discontinued his aerospace engineering studies at TU Delft to devote his time to developing his idea. He founded The Ocean Cleanup in 2013, and shortly after, his TEDx talk went viral after being shared on several news sites.

"Technology is the most potent agent of change. It is an amplifier of our human capabilities", Slat wrote in The Economist. "Whereas other change-agents rely on reshuffling the existing building blocks of society, technological innovation creates entirely new ones, expanding our problem-solving toolbox."

The Ocean Cleanup

In 2013 Slat founded the non-profit entity The Ocean Cleanup, of which he is now the CEO. The group's mission is to develop advanced technologies to rid the world's oceans of plastic. It raised US$2.2million through a crowd funding campaign with the help of 38,000 donors from 160 countries. In June 2014, the Ocean Cleanup published a 528-page feasibility study about the project's potential. Several critics declared the concept unfeasible in a technical critique of the feasibility study on the Deep Sea News website, which was cited by other publications, including Popular Science and The Guardian.

Since the Ocean Cleanup started, the organization has raised tens of millions of dollars in donations from entrepreneurs in Europe and in Silicon Valley, including Marc Benioff, CEO of Salesforce.

Cleanup systems

Dubbed Systems 001 and 001/B, the first and second systems encountered various technical failures, with System 001 unable to effectively retain plastic and suffering structural stress damage that caused an 18-meter section to break off at one point. However, in 2019, System 001/B, which was a redesign of System 001, successfully captured plastic. This first mission (which includes both systems) returned 60 bags of garbage.

In July 2021, System 002 gathered  of trash.

The Interceptor

At an unveiling of a new cleanup system dubbed The Interceptor, Slat cited research from the company which showed that 1,000 of the world's most polluted rivers were responsible for roughly 80% of the world's plastic pollution. In an effort to "close the tap" and drastically reduce the amount of plastic entering the world's oceans, The Ocean Cleanup had devised a barge-like system that was completely solar powered and was aimed to be a scalable solution that could be deployed around the world's rivers. As of mid 2022, Interceptors have been deployed in Indonesia, Malaysia, the Dominican Republic, and Vietnam, and are prepared to be deployed in Thailand and Los Angeles, California.

Awards and recognition 
 In November 2014 Slat was awarded the Champions of the Earth award of the United Nations Environment Programme.
 HM King Harald of Norway awarded Slat the Young Entrepreneur Award in 2015. 
 Forbes included Slat in their 30 Under 30 list in 2016. 
 He was selected for a Thiel Fellowship, a program started in 2011 by venture capitalist and PayPal co-founder Peter Thiel. It gives $100,000 to entrepreneurs 22 years old and younger who have left or postponed college to work on their start-up. 
 In February 2017, Reader's Digest appointed Slat European of the Year, and the Dutch magazine Elsevier awarded him Nederlander van het Jaar 2017 (Dutchman of the Year 2017). 
 In 2018, Slat was awarded the Leonardo da Vinci International Art Award and Euronews award "European Entrepreneur of the Year".

References

External links

 
 How the Oceans Can Clean Themselves — Boyan Slat at TEDxDelft

1994 births
Dutch environmentalists
21st-century Dutch inventors
Living people
Plastics and the environment
Thiel fellows
Dutch people of Croatian descent